Julian Hooper (born in Auckland in 1966) is an Auckland-based artist. His art has been described as "an assemblage of metaphors, shapes and forms" that "details an eclectic and imaginative visual language that delves into his personal ancestry.".

Hooper's works are held by the Museum of New Zealand Te Papa Tongarewa, Auckland Art Gallery Toi o Tāmaki, Queensland Art Gallery, Australian Catholic University Art Gallery, and the Sarjeant Gallery Te Whare o Rehua Whanganui.

His art has been exhibited at the Ian Potter Museum of Art, Dunedin Public Art Gallery, and Mangere Art Centre, Ng ā Tohu Uenuku.

References

1966 births
New Zealand artists
People from Auckland
Living people